Guido Messeri (4 September 1897 – 27 December 1972) was an Italian racing cyclist. He rode in the 1925 Tour de France.

References

External links
 

1897 births
1972 deaths
Italian male cyclists
Cyclists from Florence